Son of the Tiger is the first full-length album by The Big Sleep and their first to be released by French Kiss Records. It was released in September 2006 and has a total length of 45:10.

Reviews
Son of the Tiger has been described in Stylus Magazine as having some flaws but overall as "compulsively and lastingly listenable". while in the Washington Post it was called one of the more appealing examples in its genre.

Track listing

 "Brown Beauty" - 3:54
 "Murder" - 4:22
 "You Can't Touch the Untouchable" - 3:59
 "SKB" - 3:36
 "Menemy" - 4:37
 "Locomotion" - 4:30
 "Are You Ready (For Love)?" - 4:00
 "Shima" - 4:22
 "Son of the Tiger" - 4:39
 "New Strings" - 7:11

References

2006 albums